Chikkadu Dorakadu may refer to
 Chikkadu Dorakadu (1967 film)
 Chikkadu Dorakadu (1988 film)